Flyleaf is the debut studio album by American rock band Flyleaf. It was released on October 4, 2005, through Octone Records. A re-packaged CD/DVD special edition was released on October 30, 2007, which included additional acoustic tracks and music videos. The album was re-released on January 14, 2008, through Polydor Records in the United Kingdom, which included three additional acoustic tracks.

While the band's then frontwoman Lacey Sturm prominently sings, her unclean vocals are frequent throughout the album. Lyrically, the album deals with topics such as Christianity, love and death. Flyleaf received mixed reviews from music critics. It debuted at No. 88 on the Billboard 200, selling more than 13,000 copies within its first week. Due to the band's growing exposure to fame in 2007, it eventually reached its peak of No. 57 on the week of September 17, 2007, and spent more than 133 weeks on the chart. It also topped the Billboard Christian Albums chart, and has since become the ninth best-selling Christian album of the 2000s. It has sold more than 1 million copies to date, and was certified Platinum by the Recording Industry Association of America (RIAA).

Background 
The album was released October 4, 2005. On October 30, 2007, the band re-released this album repackaged as a CD/DVD Special Edition version. The Special Edition re-release has the same tracks as the original release, with the addition of acoustic versions of "Cassie", "Fully Alive", "I'm So Sick", "All Around Me", and "Red Sam" (which is the only acoustic song not released as a single). The DVD has exclusive interviews with Flyleaf and music videos of "All Around Me", "I'm So Sick" and "Fully Alive". The re-release also came packaged with a free ringtone of "All Around Me" and a "locker" poster. The album was re-released January 14, 2008, in the UK on Polydor Records but with only three additional acoustic tracks.

When A&M Records teamed with Octone Records, the album was re-printed to show the new joint-venture label arrangement. This re-printed version had "Fully Alive" at a length of 2:34, replacing the original 2:48 version, and a different back cover artwork.

The single "Cassie" was written in honor of Cassie Bernall, who was killed in the Columbine High School massacre in 1999.

Commercial performance 
Flyleaf sold over 13,000 copies of the Special Edition CD/DVD in the first week. They jumped 59 spots on the Billboard Top 200 chart up to No. 62. In the second week of sales for the Special Edition CD/DVD, Flyleaf sold over 10,100 copies. To date, it has sold over 1,000,000 copies in the U.S. certifying it as platinum.

According to Billboard, the album was the ninth best-selling Christian album between the years 2000 and 2009.

Track listing

Personnel
 Lacey Mosley – lead vocals
 Pat Seals – bass guitar
 Sameer Bhattacharya – lead guitar
 Jared Hartmann – rhythm guitar
 James Culpepper – drums, percussion
 Dave Navarro – additional guitar on "There For You"
 Ryan White of Resident Hero – background vocals on "Cassie," "So I Thought," and "Red Sam"
 Howard Benson – producer, keyboards and programming
 Mike Plotnikoff – mixing
 Leon Zervos & Chris Athens – Mastering at Sterling Sound, NY
 James Diener & Ben Berkman – A&R
 Mike Plotnikoff – recording

Production
 Hatsukazu Inagaki, Alex Uychocde – assistant engineering
 Paul Decarli – Pro Tools editing
 Jon at Drum Fetish – drum technician
 Ed DeGenaro – sound technician
 Keith Nelson – guitar technician
 7S – art direction
 Sam Erickson, Stephen Albanese – photography
 Cole Rise – cover photography
 Shannon Ronique Neall – angel illustration

Recording locations
 Bay 7 Studios, Valley Village
Sparky Dark Studio, Calabasas, CA

Mixed at
 Scream Studios, Studio City, CA
 Chalice Studios, LA

Charts

Weekly charts

Year-end charts

Accolades

References

2005 debut albums
Flyleaf (band) albums
Albums produced by Howard Benson
Albums produced by Mark Lewis (music producer)
Polydor Records albums
A&M Octone Records albums